Anne Burke may refer to:

 Anne Burke (writer) (fl. 1780–1805), Irish Gothic novelist
 Anne M. Burke (born 1944), Illinois Supreme Court Justice for Cook County, Illinois